Robert Kennedy Abbett (January 5, 1926 – June 20, 2015) was an American artist and illustrator.

Biography
Abbett was born in 1926 in Hammond, Indiana.

During the late-1950s, 1960s and 1970s, Abbett illustrated book covers for war novels, detective novels, thrillers, historical fiction and science fiction. Today, Abbett is best known for his paintings of wildlife (in particular, dogs), wilderness, sporting, and fishing.

His illustrations have been featured in a large number of books, magazines, and advertising. He has also authored or been featured in several art-related books, including A Season for Painting: The Outdoor Paintings of Robert K. Abbett  and  Wings from Cover: The Upland Images of Robert Abbett and Ed Gray.

Abbett was a graduate of both the University of Missouri and Purdue University. In 1953, Abbett moved to rural Connecticut where he built a house on an old farm (namely, Oakdale Farm). There, Abbett was inspired by the untouched wilderness and forests, and began painting what he has become famous for today: animals and countrylife.

He died on June 20, 2015, at the age of 89 at his home in Bridgewater, Connecticut.

Book covers illustrations 

Robert K. Abbett was an illustrator for Ballantine Books, Pyramid Books and Ace Books, as well as gold medal, Avon, Permabook, and Pocket Books.  He illustrated Edgar Rice Burroughs' books, including the Tarzan series, Barsoom series, and Pellucidar series.

Books
 The Quiet American by Graham Greene, Bantam Books, 1957
 The Devil to Pay by Ellery Queen (pseudonym), Pocket Books, 1958
 Spearhead by Franklin M. Davis, Jr., Permabooks, 1958
 Justice, My Brother by James Keene (pseudonym of William Everett Cook), Dell Books, 1959
 The D.A. Cooks a Goose by Erle Stanley Gardner, Pocket Books, 1959
 Turn on the Heat by A.A. Fair, Dell Books 1959
 Colonel Hugh North Solves The MULTI-MILLION-DOLLAR MURDERS, by F. Van Wyck Mason, Cardinal Edition, 1960
 Fear is the Key by Alistair MacLean, Permabook, 1960
 Kiss Off the Dead by Garrity, Gold Medal, 1960
 Mark Kilby and the Miami Mob by Robert Caine Frazer, Pocket Books, 1960
 Plot It Yourself by Rex Stout, Bantam Books, 1960
 The Fix by Jack Usher, Pocket Books, Inc., 1961
 The Grave's in the Medal by Manning Lee Stokes, Dell 1961
 The Counterfeit Courier by James C. Sheers, Dell Books, 1961
 Born of Battle by Robert Crane, Pyramid Books, 1962
 Cry, Baby by Jack Ehrlich, Dell 1962
 The Girl From Midnight by Robert Wade and Bill Miller, Gold Medal Books, 1962
 Cleopatra, by Jeffry K. Gardner, 1962
 Earth Abides, by George R. Stewart, Ace Books 1962
 The Hate Merchant by Niven Busch, Macfadden Books, 1962
 Tobruk by Peter Rabe, Bantam Books
 Acapulco G.P.O. by Day Keene, Dell Books
 The Life and Good Times of Randolf Hearst, by John Tebbel, Paperback Library, Inc., 1962
 The Case Against Satan by Ray Russell, Paperback Library, Inc., 1963
 The Bowl of Brass by Paul Wellman, Paperback Library, Inc.
 Assignment—Stella Marni (Sam Durell Series) by Edward S. Aarons, Gold Medal Book, 1965
 Bats Fly at Dusk by A. A. Fair, Dell, 1966
 Bedrooms Have Windows by A. A. Fair, Dell, 1966
 Some Women Won't Wait by A. A. Fair, Dell, 1966
 A Woman of the People by Benjamin Capps, Duell, Sloan & Pearce, 1966
 Chicago 11 by Day Keen, Dell, 1966
 The Dark Fantastic by Whit Masterson (pseudonym of Robert Wade and H. Bill Miller), Avon Books, 1966
 In the Last Analysis by Amanda Cross (pseudonym of Carolyn G. Heilbrun), 1966
 The Bull Whip Breed by J. T. Edson, Bantam Books, 1969

 Tarzan Tarzan of the Apes, Ballantine 1969The Return of Tarzan, Ballantine, 1969The Beasts of Tarzan, Ballantine 1969The Son of Tarzan, Ballantine 1969
Tarzan and the Jewels of Opar, Ballantine 1969
Jungle Tales of Tarzan, Ballantine 1969
Tarzan the Untamed, Ballantine 1969
Tarzan the Terrible, Ballantine 1969
Tarzan and the Golden Lion, Ballantine 1969
Tarzan and the Ant Men, Ballantine 1969
Tarzan and the Lost Empire, Ballantine 1969
Tarzan at the Earth's Core, Ballantine 1970
Tarzan the Invincible, Ballantine 1970
Tarzan Triumphant, Ballantine 1970
Tarzan and the City of Gold, Ballantine 1970
Tarzan and the Lion Man, Ballantine 1970
Tarzan and the Leopard Men, Ballantine 1970
Tarzan's Quest, Ballantine 1974
Tarzan and the Foreign Legion, Ballantine, 1964
Tarzan and the Madman, Ballantine 1965
Tarzan and the Castaways, Ballantine, 1965

Barsoom (Mars) 

A Princess of Mars, Ballantine 1963
The Gods of Mars, Ballantine 1963
The Warlord of Mars, Ballantine 1963
Thuvia, Maid of Mars, Ballantine 1963, 1969 (new painting)
The Chessmen of Mars, Ballantine 1963
The Master Mind of Mars, Ballantine 1963
A Fighting Man of Mars, Ballantine 1963
Swords of Mars, Ballantine 1963
Synthetic Men of Mars, Ballantine 1963
Llana of Gathol, Ballantine 1963
John Carter of Mars, Ballantine 1965

Pellucidar 
Tarzan at the Earth's Core, Ballantine 1974

References

External links 
 Robert K. Abbett official website, with paintings and a biography.
 
 AskART Robert Abbett biography
A large version of the 1962 painting by Robert Abbett for the Ace Book Earth Abides
Painting for the 1969 cover of The Convenient Marriage, by Georgette Heyer.
This page has an interview/biography of Robert K. Abbett that talks about his career as a book illustrator.

1926 births
2015 deaths
20th-century American painters
20th-century American male artists
American male painters
21st-century American painters
21st-century American male artists
American illustrators
People from Hammond, Indiana
Purdue University alumni
University of Missouri alumni
People from Bridgewater, Connecticut